Kanitkar is a surname used by Konkanastha Chitapavan sub-caste of Brahmins in India.  Kanitkars, like most other Konkanastha Chitpavan Brahmins, originate in the Konkan strip on the western seacoast of India – about 300-500 kilometers south of Mumbai. Kanitkars (other names: Satkar) were from original five towns and 23 descendant families, spread to 110 towns by 1988. Kanitkars belong to Kaushik Gotra, and consider Shree Vyadeshwar at Guhaghar, Maharashtra, India as their primary "family god" [Kul Daivat].

A large majority of Kanitkars still live in Pune, Maharashtra, India – with the rest in Mumbai, Vadodara and many other cities. Several Kanitkars have also migrated to foreign countries – United States, Australia and Singapore, to name a few.

Genealogy of Kanitkars is documented in "Kanitkar Kul Vrutanta", the latest (second) edition was published on 26 January 1988.  At that time, there were around 780 Kanitkar males and 530 females living:

These 1300+ Kanitkars live in 102 different cities/towns in 475 families.  Most are in Greater Mumbai (129), Pune (106), Sangli (19), Vadodara (39) and Kolhapur (14).

Most popular Male names were Dattatray (15), Vinayak (12), Madhav, Milind, Vishwanath and Yashwant (11 each), and Gajanan, Gopal, Laxman and Prabhakar (10 each.) Popular female names were Usha (16), Jayashree (11), Anjali and Vijaya (10 each.)

Culture of Maharashtra